Yiu Hei Man (born 22 September 1990) is a Hongkonger footballer who plays as a midfielder for Hong Kong Women League club Happy Valley AA. She is also a futsal player, and represented Hong Kong internationally in both football and futsal.people in Hong Kong thinks that she is the best soccer player in Hong Kong , she also played for the Hong Kong soccer team before .

International career
Yiu Hei Man has been capped for Hong Kong at senior level in both football and futsal. In football, she represented Hong Kong at two AFC Women's Asian Cup qualification editions (2014 and 2018), two AFC Women's Olympic Qualifying Tournament editions (2016 and 2020), two EAFF E-1 Football Championship editions (2017 and 2019) and the 2018 Asian Games.

In futsal, Yiu Hei Man played for Hong Kong at two AFC Women's Futsal Championship editions (2015 and 2018).

See also
List of Hong Kong women's international footballers

References

1990 births
Living people
Hong Kong women's futsal players
Hong Kong women's footballers
Women's association football midfielders
Hong Kong women's international footballers
Footballers at the 2014 Asian Games
Footballers at the 2018 Asian Games
Asian Games competitors for Hong Kong